The Roman Catholic Archdiocese of Kaifeng is an archdiocese located in the city of Kaifeng in Henan province, China.

History
 September 21, 1916: Established as Apostolic Vicariate of Eastern Honan from the Apostolic Vicariate of Northern Honan and Apostolic Vicariate of Southern Honan
 December 3, 1924: Renamed as Apostolic Vicariate of Kaifengfu
 April 11, 1946: Promoted as Metropolitan Archdiocese of Kaifeng

Leadership
 Archbishops of Kaifeng (Roman rite)
 Archbishop Joseph Gao Hongxiao, O.F.M. (2007–2022)
 Archbishop John Baptist Liang Xisheng (1989–2007)
 Archbishop Gaetano Pollio, P.I.M.E. (December 12, 1946–September 8, 1960)
 Vicars Apostolic of Kaifengfu (Roman Rite)
 Bishop Noè Giuseppe Tacconi, P.I.M.E. (December 3, 1924–1940)
 Vicars Apostolic of Eastern Honan (Roman Rite)
 Bishop Noè Giuseppe Tacconi, P.I.M.E. (1916–December 3, 1924)

Suffragan dioceses
 Guide
 Luoyang
 Nanyang
 Weihui
 Xinyang
 Zhengzhou
 Zhumadian

Sources
 GCatholic.org
 Catholic Hierarchy

Roman Catholic dioceses in China
Christian organizations established in 1916
Religion in Kaifeng
Roman Catholic dioceses and prelatures established in the 20th century
1916 establishments in China
Christianity in Henan